Rowdy Ramu is a 1978 Indian Malayalam film, directed by M. Krishnan Nair and produced by M. Mani. The film stars Madhu, Sharada, Jayabharathi and Jose Prakash in the lead roles. The film has musical score by Shyam.

Cast
 
Madhu as Ramu
Sharada as Shanthi
Jayabharathi as Vasanthy
Jose Prakash as Panchayat president Raghavan Nair
Manavalan Joseph as Sekhara Pilla
Raghavan as Vaasu
Adoor Bhavani as Vaasu's mother
Anandavally  as Devaki
Aranmula Ponnamma as Lakshmykuttyamma
Aryad Gopalakrishnan as Chathan
Baby Sreekala as Sumathi
Balan K. Nair as Pattalam Bhasi
KPAC Sunny as Dasappan
Poojappura Ravi as Mani Swami
Sadhana as Thankamma
Veeran as Ramu's father
 Ramu
 Sukumaran Nair
 Hassan
 Soman
 Vasantha
 Girija
 Sarojini

Soundtrack

References

External links
 

1978 films
1970s Malayalam-language films
Films directed by M. Krishnan Nair